The 2007 World Fencing Championships were held at the SCC Peterburgsky in Saint Petersburg, Russia. The event took place from September 28 to October 7, 2007.

Medal summary

Men's events

Women's events

Medal table

Results overview

Men

Epée individual
3 October - Final

Epee team
7 October - Final

Foil individual
30 September - Final

Foil team
5 October - Final

Sabre individual
2 October - Final

Sabre team
6 October - Final

Women

Epée individual
1 October - Final

Epée team
6 October - Final

Foil individual
4 October - Final

Foil team
7 October - Final

Sabre individual
29 September - Final

Sabre team
5 October - Final

External links
Official website
Results

World Fencing Championships
W
Fencing Championships
Sports competitions in Saint Petersburg
International fencing competitions hosted by Russia
September 2007 sports events in Europe
World Fencing Championships
October 2007 sports events in Europe